Allied Security Trust (AST) is an independent, not-for-profit cooperative that provides its members with a method of mitigating the risk of patent assertions and litigation.

Business
Each member contribute to the operating expense of the trust, and hold funds in escrow for the purchase of patents.  Each member's escrow funds are used for the purchase of only those patents that they are interested in. The members involved in the purchase are then licensed to the patents.  After a certain period of time, the patents are sold or donated.  This is known as a catch and release strategy.  AST does not litigate.

Members
Allied Security Trust public members in 2023, include
 Avaya
 Adobe
 Cisco 
 Dolby
 Google
 IBM
 Intel
 Meta
 Microsoft
 Oracle
 Philips
 Salesforce
 ServiceNow
 Snap
 Sony
 Spotify
 Uber
 Verizon

Executives
Russell Binns, Jr., CEO 
Kerry Hopkin, CFO
Ray Strimaitis, VP, Corporate Development & Global Strategy
Mihir Patel, VP, Technology

See also
PatentFreedom
Patent troll
RPX Corporation
Open Invention Network

References

External links
Home page
IAM Magazine article comparing & contrasting AST with RPX, May/June 2010

Companies based in New York (state)
Defensive patent aggregation companies of the United States